Benjamin Drake Wright (January 23, 1799 – April 28, 1874) was a Florida lawyer, journalist, and Whig politician who served in Territorial Legislature, the State Senate, and as a Florida Supreme Court justice in 1853, succeeding Walker Anderson. He was born in Wilkes-Barre, Pennsylvania on January 23, 1799, the son of William and Sarah Ann Wright. He married Josephine De La Rua on February 23, 1826. He owned the Pensacola Gazette from 1834 to 1839 and  edited the paper till 1846. He opposed secession and refused to swear allegiance to the Confederacy. He died on April 28, 1874.

Wright was admitted to the Luzerne County, Pennsylvania bar on April 7, 1820. When he was twenty-four, he moved to the Pensacola area. He became friends with and went to work for Richard K. Call, a protégé of Andrew Jackson. In April 1824 he was appointed to the Florida Territorial Council. In May, the president appointed him United States Attorney for Middle Florida, and then for West Florida in  February 1826.

His political career encountered difficulties after he accused Judge Henry Marie Brackenridge of malfeasance in November 1827. The judge retaliated by seeking Wright's replacement through a letter writing campaign and his political connections. As a result, another man was appointed in his place when his term expired in 1830. He represented Escambia County in the territorial council from 1831 to 1833 and again in 1837. He served as a member of the 1838 constitutional convention till January 5, 1839. That year, he became a member of the Territorial Senate.

He left office to work behind the scenes politically. He served in the Florida Senate in 1845, and again returned to his law practice. In 1850 he became an Alabama and Florida Railroad commissioner. The governor appointed him to the Supreme Court in 1853 to replace Walker Anderson. He was replaced in turn when the voters elected Thomas Baltzell, the first Florida Justice chosen by popular election.

He again returned to his Pensacola business interests and law practice. He became president of the Alabama and Florida Railroad in 1856. He served on the 1865 constitutional convention, but never again served as an elected official. He died on April 28, 1874.

References 
 THE HISTORICAL SOCIETY OF FLORIDA, 1856. Online. May 14, 2008.
Manley, Walter W., Brown, E. Canter. and Rise, Eric W. The Supreme Court of Florida and Its Predecessor Courts, 1821–1917. pp 148 – 153. University Press of Florida. Gainesville, Florida. 1997.  eBook . . at Netlbrary. Online. April 23, 2008.
Pearce, George F. Pensacola During the Civil War: A Thorn in the Side of the Confederacy. pg. 170. University Press of Florida. Pensacola. 2000. 
Thursby, Mary Agnes. SUCCESSION OF JUSTICES OF SUPREME COURT OF FLORIDA Online. May 14, 2008.

1799 births
1874 deaths
Mayors of Pensacola, Florida
Justices of the Florida Supreme Court
Florida Whigs
Florida lawyers
American male journalists
Politicians from Wilkes-Barre, Pennsylvania
People from Escambia County, Florida
Florida state senators
Members of the Florida Territorial Legislature
19th-century American politicians
Journalists from Pennsylvania
Writers from Wilkes-Barre, Pennsylvania
19th-century American judges
19th-century American lawyers